Haberlandia legraini is a moth in the family Cossidae. It is found in the Republic of Congo and possibly eastern Gabon. The habitat consists of swamp forests and riparian forests.

The wingspan is about 21 mm. The forewings are Isabella colour, with brown lines and striae from the costal margin towards the dorsum. The hindwings are uniform buffy olive.

Etymology
The species is named in honour of Dr Albert Legrain.

References

Natural History Museum Lepidoptera generic names catalog

Moths described in 2011
Metarbelinae
Taxa named by Ingo Lehmann